O'Mahony (Old Irish: Ó Mathghamhna; Modern Irish: Ó Mathúna) is the original name of the clan, with breakaway clans also spelled O'Mahoney, or simply Mahony, Mahaney and Mahoney, without the prefix. Brodceann O'Mahony was the eldest of the four sons of Mathghamain, known as "The Four Descendants". 

The O'Mahonys were Cenél nÁeda princes of the ancient Eóganacht Raithlind. They were also for a period kings of Munster and Desmond, and take their name from Mathghamhain, son of Cian, son of Máel Muad mac Brain, King of Munster from around 960 to 970, and then again from 976 to 978. From 970 to 976 he was king of Desmond. His son Cian became a close ally of Brian Bóruma and married his daughter Sadb. From this marriage descend the O'Mahonys. Their Dukedom of O'Mahony came to an end in 1740.

List of people
 Bernard O'Mahoney, crime author
 Dave Allen (comedian), Real name David Tynan O'Mahony. Famous Irish-English comedian.
 Bertha Mahony, children's literature specialist
 Charles Mahoney (disambiguation)
 Conor O'Mahony (priest), Irish Jesuit priest
 Cynthia L. Mahoney, Episcopalian nun and former chaplain in New York City, present at "Ground Zero"
 Dan Mahoney (baseball), baseball player
 Dan Mahoney (journalist), Irish-American journalist investigated for possible Communist activities
 Dan Mahoney (politician), Australian politician
 Daniel O'Mahony, author
 Darragh O'Mahony, rugby player
 Dennis Mahony, newspaper founder
 Dermot O'Mahony, Irish politician and farmer
 Duncan O'Mahony, Canadian footballer
 Eugene O'Mahony, Irish museum curator and entomologist
 Flor O'Mahony, Irish politician
 Francis Sylvester Mahony, Irish humorist
 Frank P. Mahony, Australian artist
 George P. Mahoney, Catholic politician from Maryland
Gwen O'Mahony, Canadian politician
 J. Daniel Mahoney, U.S. judge and founder of the Conservative Party
 Jeremiah Mahoney (Medal of Honor), Medal of Honor recipient from the American Civil War
 Joan Mahoney, American law professor
 Jock Mahoney, American actor and stuntman
 John Mahoney (1940–2018), English-American actor
 John O'Mahony, scholar and founder of the Fenian Brotherhood
 John O'Mahony (Mayo politician)
 John Keefer Mahony, Canadian recipient of the Victoria Cross
 Joseph C. O'Mahoney, United States Senator from Wyoming
 Katharine A. O'Keeffe O'Mahoney (1855–1918), Irish-born American educator, lecturer, writer, editor
Margaret O'Mahony, Irish civil engineer
Margaret Murphy O'Mahony (born 1969), Irish politician
 Marion Mahony Griffin, American architect and artist
 Maureen Mahoney, appellate lawyer
 Patricia Mahoney, American diplomat
 Patrick Mahoney, Irish recipient of the Victoria Cross
 Pat Mahoney, PC, Canadian judge, politician, lawyer and businessman
 Paul Mahoney (American lawyer), American law professor
 Paul Mahoney (English judge), British judge of the European Court of Human Rights
 Peter O'Mahony, rugby player
 Pierce Charles de Lacy O'Mahony, Irish Protestant Nationalist, philanthropist, politician and MP
 Roger Mahony, American Cardinal of the Roman Catholic Church
 Rosemary Mahoney, American writer of non-fiction narrative
 Seán O'Mahony, Irish politician
 Sean O'Mahony (Gaelic footballer) (born 1976), Gaelic footballer
 Sean O'Mahony (journalist) (1932–2020), British music writer and magazine editor
 Steve Mahoney, Canadian politician
 Suzanne Somers née Mahoney, U.S. actress
 Thomas O'Mahony, politician
 Walter J. Mahoney, American lawyer and politician
 William Mahony (disambiguation)
 William B. Mahoney, U.S. journalist and substance-abuse counselor

Places

 Dunlough Castle
 Mahoney Lake
 Mahoney's Corner, Nova Scotia
 Bishop James Mahoney High School
 Dunmanus Castle

Flying machines and equations
 Beck-Mahoney Sorceress
 Benjamin–Bona–Mahony equation
 Mahoney tables

See also
 Mahoney
 Eóganachta
 Irish nobility
 Dromore Castle (disambiguation)

Other Munster families

 O'Donoghue
 O'Brien, Prince of Thomond
 O'Donovan
 McGillycuddy of the Reeks
 O'Grady of Kilballyowen

References
 Byrne, Francis J., Irish Kings and High-Kings. Four Courts Press. 2nd edition, 2001.
 Charles-Edwards, Thomas M., Early Christian Ireland. Cambridge University Press. 2000.
 MacLysaght, Edward, Irish Families: Their Names, Arms and Origins. Irish Academic Press. 4th edition, 1998.
 O'Hart, John, Irish Pedigrees. Dublin: James Duffy and Co. 5th edition, 1892.
 Todd, James Henthorn (ed. and tr.), Cogadh Gaedhel re Gallaibh: The War of the Gaedhil with the Gaill. Longmans. 1867. (pedigree: pg. 248)

External links
 The O Mahony Society Updated website for the society
 The O'Mahony Society
 O'Mahony Pedigree at Library Ireland
 Famille O'Mahony at GeneaWiki (in French)